Hsu Chen-wei (born 12 October 1968) is a Taiwanese politician. She is the incumbent Magistrate of Hualien County since 25 December 2018.

Political careers
Publicly known as the wife of former Hualien County Magistrate Fu Kun-chi, Hsu was appointed as the chairperson of Hualien China Youth Corps during the first term of Fu as magistrate. She was then later appointed as the captain of Hualien's Community Patrol and subsequently the head of National Women's League.

2014 Hualien County magistrate election
Hsu participated in the 2014 Hualien County magistrate election on 29 November 2014 as an independent candidate finishing in 4th place, losing to her own husband Fu Kun-chi. This election was the first time in the history of the Republic of China that both husband and wife run for the same public position simultaneously.

2018 Hualien County magistrate election

References

External links

 

1968 births
Living people
Magistrates of Hualien County
21st-century Taiwanese women politicians
21st-century Taiwanese politicians
Spouses of Taiwanese politicians